Aircraft Accident Investigation Bureau (AAIB, BFU; , BEAA; , UIIA) was the Swiss bureau of aircraft accident investigation. In 2011, it was replaced by the Swiss Transportation Safety Investigation Board.

History
The Aircraft Accident Investigation Bureau was established  by the Swiss parliament. Operations began in 1960. The bureau was headquartered on the grounds of Payerne Airport and in Payerne.

Normally the original aircraft accident reports were written in the language of the Swiss region where the aircraft accident occurred. Some reports had English versions available.

The agency was disestablished on 1 November 2011 when it and the Investigation Bureau for Railway, Funicular and Boat Accidents merged to form the Swiss Accident Investigation Board.

See also
Crossair Flight 498
Crossair Flight 3597
 Investigation Bureau for Railway, Funicular and Boat Accidents

References

External links
 Official website

Government of Switzerland
Aviation organisations based in Switzerland
Organizations investigating aviation accidents and incidents
1960 establishments in Switzerland
Organizations established in 1960
Organizations disestablished in 2011
Payerne